Lebanon has never participated in the Eurovision Song Contest. The country's broadcasting organisation, was set to make the country's debut at the Eurovision Song Contest 2005 with the song "" performed by Aline Lahoud, but withdrew due to Lebanon's laws barring the broadcast of Israeli content.

2005 contest 
On 3 November 2004, it was announced that Aline Lahoud was internally selected by the network to represent Lebanon. Her orient-occident song "", sung in French and written by Jad Rahbani and Romeo Lahoud, was chosen in mid-February. Lahoud was scheduled to present her song in the semi-final held on 19 May 2005.

On 15 December 2004,  announced that financial constraints forced them to withdraw from the contest, and denied reports that it was due to political conflicts with Israel. However, five days later, the European Broadcasting Union (EBU) reached an agreement with Télé Liban and Lebanon was put on the official list of participants.

In early March 2005, the official Lebanese Eurovision Song Contest website did not list Israel as a participant. After the EBU asked  to resolve the issue within 24 hours or face disqualification, the site removed the complete list of participants and replaced the page with a link to Eurovision.tv, the official Eurovision website.

Later that month, the EBU asked  to assure that they would broadcast the entire contest, including the Israeli entry, without interruption.  could not guarantee that request, so on 18 March 2005, it once again announced its withdrawal from the contest. Lebanese legislation prohibited the broadcast of Israeli content on Lebanese television networks.  wrote on its website that it "is not permitted to broadcast the performance of the Israeli participant, thereby breaching the rules of the Eurovision Song Contest 2005" and forcing its withdrawal. Since  withdrew almost three months after the 15 December "no consequence" withdrawal deadline, the broadcaster was penalised, losing its participation fee and was served with a three-year ban.

Subsequent events 
With the three-year ban,  was not eligible to re-enter the Eurovision Song Contest until 2009.

In 2007, Lebanon-born singer Mika stated that he was interested in entering the contest for Lebanon in 2008, but for one of the other Lebanese television stations that would not be impacted by the ban, such as the Lebanese Broadcasting Corporation International or Future Television. Neither broadcaster was a member of the EBU, but was eligible to join the organisation. Mika himself, however, did eventually become involved in Eurovision, as he was one of the hosts of the 2022 contest in Turin.

Participation overview

References

External links 
 Entry information for Lebanon in the 2005 contest via Eurovision.tv (archived)

Countries in the Eurovision Song Contest
Eurovision